Siempre Es Hoy (Spanish for It is always today) is the third album by Argentine rock musician Gustavo Cerati.

The album was advertised as "Cerati's Rock Album", however, it has a more of an electronic style than rock. Music critics were pleased with Siempre Es Hoy, giving it ratings ranging from 4 to 5 stars.

Some of the songs were remixed for the 2003 album, Reversiones: Siempre Es Hoy. These songs were remixed by several guest musicians including Leandro Fresco, Bostich from Nortec Collective, Miranda!, Kinky and DJ Orange, all to various electronic-music styles.

Track listing

Sales and certifications

References

Gustavo Cerati albums
2002 albums
Sony BMG Norte albums